A railway air brake is a railway brake power braking system with compressed air as the operating medium. Modern trains rely upon a fail-safe air brake system that is based upon a design patented by George Westinghouse on April 13, 1869.  The Westinghouse Air Brake Company was subsequently organized to manufacture and sell Westinghouse's invention. In various forms, it has been nearly universally adopted.

The Westinghouse system uses air pressure to charge air reservoirs (tanks) on each car. Full air pressure causes each car to release the brakes. A subsequent reduction or loss of air pressure causes each car to apply its brakes, using the compressed air stored in its reservoirs.

Overview

Straight air brake
 In the air brake's simplest form, called the straight air system, compressed air pushes on a piston in a cylinder. The piston is connected through mechanical linkage to brake shoes that can rub on the train wheels, using the resulting friction to slow the train.  The mechanical linkage can become quite elaborate, as it evenly distributes force from one pressurized air cylinder to 8 or 12 wheels.

The pressurized air comes from an air compressor in the locomotive and is sent from car to car by a train line made up of pipes beneath each car and hoses between cars. The principal problem with the straight air braking system is that any separation between hoses and pipes causes loss of air pressure and hence the loss of the force applying the brakes. This could easily cause a runaway train. Straight air brakes are still used on locomotives, although as a dual circuit system, usually with each bogie (truck) having its own circuit.

Westinghouse air brake
In order to design a system without the shortcomings of the straight air system, Westinghouse invented a system wherein each piece of railroad rolling stock was equipped with an air reservoir and a triple valve, also known as a control valve.
 Unlike the straight air system, the Westinghouse system uses a reduction in air pressure in the train line to indirectly apply the brakes. 

The triple valve is so named because it performs three functions: It allows air into an air tank ready to be used, it applies the brakes, and it releases them. In so doing, it supports certain other actions (i.e. it 'holds' or maintains the application and it permits the exhaust of brake cylinder pressure and the recharging of the reservoir during the release). In his patent application, Westinghouse refers to his 'triple-valve device' because of the three component valvular parts comprising it: the diaphragm-operated poppet valve feeding reservoir air to the brake cylinder, the reservoir charging valve, and the brake cylinder release valve. Westinghouse soon improved the device by removing the poppet valve action, these three components became the piston valve, the slide valve, and the graduating valve.

 If the pressure in the train line is lower than that of the reservoir, the brake cylinder exhaust portal is closed and air from the car's reservoir is fed into the brake cylinder. Pressure increases in the cylinder, applying the brakes, while decreasing in the reservoir. This action continues until equilibrium between the brake pipe pressure and reservoir pressure is achieved. At that point, the airflow from the reservoir to the brake cylinder is lapped off and the cylinder is maintained at a constant pressure.
 If the pressure in the train line is higher than that of the reservoir, the triple valve connects the train line to the reservoir feed, causing the air pressure in the reservoir to increase. The triple valve also causes the brake cylinder to be exhausted to the atmosphere, releasing the brakes.
 As the pressure in the train line and that of the reservoir equalize, the triple valve closes, causing the air in the reservoir to be sealed in, and the brake cylinder is not pressurized.

When the engine operator applies the brake by operating the locomotive brake valve, the train line vents to atmosphere at a controlled rate, reducing the train line pressure and in turn triggering the triple valve on each car to feed air into its brake cylinder. When the engine operator releases the brake, the locomotive brake valve portal to atmosphere is closed, allowing the train line to be recharged by the compressor of the locomotive. The subsequent increase of train line pressure causes the triple valves on each car to discharge the contents of the brake cylinder to the atmosphere, releasing the brakes and recharging the reservoirs.

The Westinghouse system is thus fail safe—any failure in the train line, including a separation ("break-in-two") of the train, will cause a loss of train line pressure, causing the brakes to be applied and bringing the train to a stop, thus preventing a runaway train.

Modern systems
Modern air brake systems serve two functions:
Service braking applies and releases the brakes during normal operations.
Emergency braking rapidly applies the brakes in the event of a brake pipe failure or an emergency application by the engine operator or passenger emergency alarm/cord/handle.

When the train brakes are applied during normal operation, the engine operator makes a "service application" or a "service rate reduction”, which means that the brake pipe pressure reduces at a controlled rate. It takes several seconds for the brake pipe pressure to reduce and consequently takes several seconds for the brakes to apply throughout the train. The speed of pressure changes during a service reduction is limited by the compressed air's ability to overcome the flow resistance of the relatively-small-diameter pipe and numerous elbows throughout the length of the train, and the relatively-small exhaust port on the head-end locomotive, which means the brakes of the rear-most cars will apply sometime after those of the forward-most cars apply, so some slack run-in can be expected. The gradual reduction in brake pipe pressure will mitigate this effect.

Modern locomotives employ two air brake systems. The system which controls the brake pipe is called the automatic brake and provides service and emergency braking control for the entire train. The locomotive(s) at the head of the train (the "lead consist") have a secondary system called the independent brake.  The independent brake is a "straight air" system that makes brake applications on the head-of-train locomotive consist independently of the automatic brake, providing for more nuanced train control.  The two braking systems may interact differently as a matter of preference by the locomotive builder or the railroad.  In some systems, the automatic and independent applications will be additive; in some systems the greater of the two will apply to the locomotive consist.   The independent system also provides a bail off mechanism, which releases the brakes on the lead locomotives without affecting the brake application on the rest of the train.

In the event the train needs to make an emergency stop, the engine operator can make an "emergency application," which will rapidly vent all of the brake pipe pressure to atmosphere, resulting in a faster application of the train's brakes. An emergency application also results when the integrity of the brake pipe is lost, as all air will also be immediately vented to atmosphere.

An emergency brake application brings in an additional component of each car's air brake system. The triple valve is divided into two portions: the service section, which contains the mechanism used during brake applications made during service reductions, and the emergency section, which senses the faster emergency reduction of train line pressure. In addition, each car's air brake reservoir is divided into two sections—the service portion and the emergency portion—and is known as the "dual-compartment reservoir”. Normal service applications transfer air pressure from the service section to the brake cylinder, while emergency applications cause the triple valve to direct all air in both the sections of the dual-compartment reservoir to the brake cylinder, resulting in a 20 to 30 percent stronger application.

The emergency portion of each triple valve is activated by the higher rate of reduction of brake pipe pressure. Due to the length of trains and the small diameter of the brake pipe, the rate of reduction is highest near the front of the train (in the case of an engine operator-initiated emergency application) or near the break in the brake pipe (in the case of loss of brake pipe integrity). Farther away from the source of the emergency application, the rate of reduction can be reduced to the point where triple valves will not detect the application as an emergency reduction. To prevent this, each triple valve's emergency portion contains an auxiliary vent port, which, when activated by an emergency application, also locally vents the brake pipe's pressure directly to atmosphere. This serves to more rapidly vent the brake pipe and hasten the propagation of the emergency reduction rate along the entire length of the train.

Use of distributed power (i.e., remotely controlled locomotive units mid-train and/or at the rear end) somewhat mitigates the time-lag problem with long trains, because a telemetered radio signal from the engine operator in the front locomotive commands the distant units to initiate brake pressure reductions that propagate quickly through nearby cars.

Working pressures
The train brakes are released by admitting reduced and regulated main reservoir air pressure to the brake pipe through the engineer's automatic brake valve. The brakes are applied when the engineer moves the automatic brake handle to a "service" position, which causes a reduction in brake pipe pressure.

During normal service, the pressure in the brake pipe is never reduced to zero and in fact, the smallest reduction that will cause a satisfactory brake response is used to conserve brake pipe pressure.  A sudden pressure reduction caused by a loss of brake pipe integrity (e.g., a blown hose), the train breaking in two and uncoupling air hoses, or the engineer moving the automatic brake valve to the emergency position, will cause an emergency brake application.  On the other hand, a slow leak that gradually reduces brake pipe pressure to zero, something that might happen if the air compressor is inoperative and therefore not maintaining main reservoir pressure, will not cause an emergency brake application.

Enhancements 
Electro-pneumatic or EP brakes are a type of air brake that allows for immediate application of brakes throughout the train instead of the sequential application. EP brakes have been in British practice since 1949 and also used in German high-speed trains (most notably the ICE) since the late 1980s; they are fully described in Electro-pneumatic brake system on British railway trains.  Electro-pneumatic brakes are currently in testing in North America and South Africa on captive service ore and coal trains.

Passenger trains have had for a long time a 3-wire version of the electro-pneumatic brake, which gives up to seven levels of braking force.

In North America, Westinghouse Air Brake supplied High Speed Control brake equipment for several post-World War II streamlined passenger trains. This was an electrically controlled overlay on conventional D-22 passenger and 24-RL locomotive brake equipment. On the conventional side, the control valve set a reference pressure in a volume, which set brake cylinder pressure via a relay valve. On the electric side, pressure from a second straight-air trainline controlled the relay valve via a two-way check valve. This "straight air" trainline was charged (from reservoirs on each car) and released by magnet valves on each car, controlled electrically by a 3 wire trainline, in turn controlled by an "electro-pneumatic master controller" in the controlling locomotive. This controller compared the pressure in the straight air trainline with that supplied by a self lapping portion of the engineers valve, signaling all of the "apply" or "release" magnets valves in the train to open simultaneously, changing the pressure in the "straight air" trainline much more rapidly and evenly than possible by simply supplying air directly from the locomotive. Each axle was also equipped with anti-lock brake equipment. The combination minimized braking distances, allowing more full-speed running between stops. The "straight air" (electro-pneumatic trainline),  anti-lock, and speed graduating portions of the system were not dependent on each other in any way, and any or all of these options could be supplied separately.

Later systems replace the automatic air brake with an electrical wire which runs in a circle round the whole train and has to be kept energized to keep the brakes off. In the UK it is known as a "train wire". It is routed through various "governors" (switches operated by air pressure) which monitor critical components such as compressors, brake pipes and air reservoirs. Also if the train divides the wire will be broken, ensuring that all motors are switched off and both portions of the train have an immediate emergency brake application.

More recent innovations are electronically controlled pneumatic brakes where the brakes of all the wagons (cars) and locomotives are connected by a kind of local area network, which allows individual control of the brakes on each wagon, and the reporting back of performance of each wagon's brakes.

Limitations 

The Westinghouse air brake system is very reliable, but not infallible. The car reservoirs recharge only when the brake pipe pressure is higher than the reservoir pressure. Fully recharging the reservoirs on a long train can require considerable time (8 to 10 minutes in some cases), during which the brake pipe pressure will be lower than locomotive reservoir pressure.

If the brakes must be applied before recharging has been completed, a larger brake pipe reduction will be required in order to achieve the desired amount of braking effort, as the system is starting out at a lower point of equilibrium (lower overall pressure). If many brake pipe reductions are made in short succession ("fanning the brake" in railroad slang), a point may be reached where car reservoir pressure will be severely depleted, resulting in substantially reduced brake cylinder piston force, causing the brakes to fail. On a descending grade, the result will be a runaway.

In the event of a loss of braking due to reservoir depletion, the engine driver may be able to regain control with an emergency brake application, as the emergency portion of each car's dual-compartment reservoir should be fully charged—it is not affected by normal service reductions. The triple valves detect an emergency reduction based on the rate of brake pipe pressure reduction. Therefore, as long as a sufficient volume of air can be rapidly vented from the brake pipe, each car's triple valve will cause an emergency brake application. However, if the brake pipe pressure is too low due to an excessive number of brake applications, an emergency application will not produce a large enough volume of air flow to trip the triple valves, leaving the engine driver with no means to stop the train.

To prevent a runaway due to loss of brake pressure, dynamic (rheostatic) braking can be utilized so the locomotive(s) will assist in retarding the train. Often, blended braking, the simultaneous application of dynamic and train brakes, will be used to maintain a safe speed and keep the slack bunched on descending grades. Care would then be given when releasing the service and dynamic brakes to prevent draw-gear damage caused by a sudden run out of the train's slack.

Another solution to loss of brake pressure is the two-pipe system, fitted on most locomotive-hauled passenger stock and many freight wagons. In addition to the traditional brake pipe, this enhancement adds the main reservoir pipe, which is continuously charged with air directly from the locomotive's main reservoir. The main reservoir is where the locomotive's air compressor output is stored, and is ultimately the source of compressed air for all systems that use it.

Since the main reservoir pipe is kept constantly pressurized by the locomotive, the car reservoirs can be charged independently of the brake pipe, this being accomplished via a check valve to prevent backfeeding into the pipe. This arrangement helps to reduce the above described pressure loss problems, and also reduces the time required for the brakes to release, since the brake pipe only has to recharge itself.

Main reservoir pipe pressure can also be used to supply air for auxiliary systems such as pneumatic door operators or air suspension. Nearly all passenger trains (all in the UK and USA), and many freights, now have the two-pipe system.

Accidents 
At both ends of each car, there are angle cocks fitted. These valves cut off the air from the train line and vent the coupling hoses for uncoupling cars. The air brake only operates if the angle cocks are open except the ones at the front of the locomotive and at the end of the train. 

The air brake can fail if one of the angle cocks is accidentally closed. In this case, the brakes on the wagons behind the closed cock will fail to respond to the driver's command. This happened in the 1953 Pennsylvania Railroad train wreck involving the Federal Express, a Pennsylvania Railroad train which became runaway while heading into Washington DC's Union Station, causing the train to crash into the passenger concourse and fall through the floor.  Similarly, in the Gare de Lyon rail accident, a valve was accidentally closed by the crew, reducing braking power.

There are a number of safeguards that are usually taken to prevent this sort of accident happening. Railroads have strict government-approved procedures for testing the air brake systems when making up trains in a yard or picking up cars en route. These generally involve connecting the air brake hoses, charging up the brake system, setting the brakes and manually inspecting the cars to ensure the brakes are applied, and then releasing the brakes and manually inspecting the cars to ensure the brakes are released. Particular attention is usually paid to the rearmost car of the train, either by manual inspection or via an automated end-of-train device, to ensure that brake pipe continuity exists throughout the entire train. When brake pipe continuity exists throughout the train, failure of the brakes to apply or release on one or more cars is an indication that the cars' triple valves are malfunctioning. Depending on the location of the air test, the repair facilities available, and regulations governing the number of inoperative brakes permitted in a train, the car may be set out for repair or taken to the next terminal where it can be repaired.

Standardisation 
The modern air brake is not identical with the original airbrake as there have been slight changes in the design of the triple valve, which are not completely compatible between versions, and which must therefore be introduced in phases.  However, the basic air brakes used on railways worldwide are remarkably compatible.

European systems
European railway air brakes include the Kunze-Knorr brake (invented by Georg Knorr and manufactured by Knorr-Bremse) and the Oerlikon. The working principle is the same as for the Westinghouse air brake. In the steam era, Britain's railways were divided – some using vacuum brakes and some using air brakes – but there was a gradual standardization on the vacuum brake. Some locomotives, e.g. on the London, Brighton and South Coast Railway, were dual-fitted so that they could work with either vacuum- or air-braked trains. In the diesel era, the process was reversed and British Railways switched from vacuum-braked to air-braked rolling stock in the 1960s.

Vacuum brakes 

The main competitor to the air brake is the vacuum brake, which operates on negative pressure.  The vacuum brake is a little simpler than the air brake. Instead of an air compressor, steam engines have an ejector with no moving parts, and diesel or electric locomotives have a mechanical or electrical "exhauster".  Disconnection taps at the ends of cars are not required because the loose hoses are sucked onto a mounting block.

However, the maximum pressure in a vacuum system is limited to atmospheric pressure, so all the equipment has to be much larger and heavier to compensate. That disadvantage is made worse at high altitude. The vacuum brake is also considerably slower to both apply and release the brake, which requires a greater level of skill and anticipation from the driver. Conversely, the vacuum brake originally had the advantage of allowing gradual release, whereas the Westinghouse automatic air brake was originally available in only the direct-release form still common in freight service.

A primary fault of vacuum brakes is the inability to find leaks easily. In a positive air system, a leak is quickly found due to the escaping pressurized air. Discovering a vacuum leak is more difficult, although it is easier to repair, because a piece of rubber (for example) can just be tied around the leak and will be firmly held in place by the vacuum.

Electro-vacuum brakes have been used with considerable success on South African electric multiple unit trains. Despite requiring larger and heavier equipment, as stated above, the performance of the electro-vacuum brake approached that of contemporary electro-pneumatic brakes. However, their use has not been repeated.

See also  
 
 Driver's brake valve
 Dual brake

References 

 Air Brake and Train Handling Manual. Copyright 2006 Alaska Railroad Corporation
 Air Brake and Train Handling Manual. Copyright 2003 BNSF Railway Company
 AAR wheel dynamometer - braking: 
 Compressed Air Operations manual, McGraw Hill Book Company

External links 
Information
 Railway-Technical: Air Brakes
 How Your Train Stops, by Bill Reiche 1951 article with illustration

Railway brakes
1872 introductions
1872 in rail transport
Wabtec